The Maphumulo Local Municipality council consists of twenty-three members elected by mixed-member proportional representation. Twelve councillors are elected by first-past-the-post voting in twelve wards, while the remaining eleven are chosen from party lists so that the total number of party representatives is proportional to the number of votes received.

In the election of 3 August 2016 the African National Congress (ANC) won a majority of thirteen seats on the council. The party lost its majority in the election of 1 November 2021, obtaining a plurality of eleven seats as the council expanded from twenty-two to twenty-three members.

Results 
The following table shows the composition of the council after past elections.

December 2000 election

The following table shows the results of the 2000 election.

March 2006 election

The following table shows the results of the 2006 election.

May 2011 election

The following table shows the results of the 2011 election.

August 2016 election

The following table shows the results of the 2016 election.

November 2021 election

The following table shows the results of the 2021 election.

By-elections from November 2021
The following by-elections were held to fill vacant ward seats in the period from November 2021.

After the assassination of the ANC's ward 11 councillor in September 2022, a by-election was held on 30 November. The ANC candidate won the by-election, increasing the party's share of the vote from under 50% to over 60%.

References

Maphumulo
Elections in KwaZulu-Natal
Maphumulo Local Municipality